Hansen may refer to:

Places
 Cape Hansen, Antarctica
 Hansen, Idaho, town in the United States
 Hansen, Nebraska, United States
 Hansen, Wisconsin, town in the United States
 Hansen Township, Ontario, Canada
Hansen, Germany, a small parish in the borough of Uelzen

Other
 Hansen (surname), includes a list of people with the name
 Hansen's, a beverage company now known as Monster Beverage
 Hansen (crater), a lunar crater
 Hansen Writing Ball, an early kind of typewriter from Denmark
 Hansen's disease, another name for leprosy
 Helly-Hansen, Norwegian manufacturer of sports, work, and outdoor gear
 Hansen (horse)
 Chr. Hansen, a Danish chemical and biotechnology company

See also 
 Hanson (disambiguation)
 Justice Hansen (disambiguation)